Brest, formerly Brest-Litovsk and Brest-on-the-Bug, is a city in Belarus at the border with Poland opposite the Polish city of Terespol, where the Bug and Mukhavets rivers meet, making it a border town. It is the capital city of the Brest Region. As of 2019, it has a population of 350,616.

Brest is a historical site for many cultures, as it hosted important historical events, such as the Union of Brest and Treaty of Brest-Litovsk. Furthermore, the Brest Fortress was recognized by the Soviet Union as a Hero Fortress in honour of the defense of Brest Fortress in June 1941.

From the Late Middle Ages to 1795, the city was part of the Grand Duchy of Lithuania, which later became a part of the Polish–Lithuanian Commonwealth from 1569. In 1795, it was incorporated into the Russian Empire with the Third Partition of Poland. After the Polish-Soviet War, the city became part of the Second Polish Republic. In 1939, during the Invasion of Poland by Nazi Germany and the Soviet Union, the city was first captured by the Wehrmacht and soon passed on to the USSR per the German–Soviet Frontier Treaty. In 1941, it was retaken by the Germans during Operation Barbarossa. In 1944, it was retaken by the Soviet Red Army during the Lublin–Brest offensive. The city was part of the Byelorussian SSR until the breakup of the USSR in 1991. Since then, Brest has been part of independent Belarus.

Etymology
Several theories attempt to explain the origin of the city's name. It may have the Slavic root beresta meaning "birch", or "bark". The name could also originate from Slavic root berest meaning "elm". It could likewise have come from the Lithuanian word brasta meaning "ford".

Once a center of Jewish scholarship, the city has the Yiddish name , hence the term "Brisker" used to describe followers of the influential Soloveitchik family of rabbis. Traditionally, Belarusian-speakers called the city .

Brest became a part of the Grand Duchy of Lithuania in 1319. After World War II, the city became part of the Byelorussian Soviet Socialist Republic with the name simplified as Brest.

Brest's coat of arms, adopted on 26 January 1991, features an arrow pointed upwards and a bow (both silver) on a sky-blue shield. An alternative coat of arms has a red shield. Sigismund II Augustus, King of Poland and Grand Duke of Lithuania, first granted Brest a coat of arms in 1554.

History

The city was founded by the Slavs. As a town, Brest – Berestye in Kievan Rus – was first mentioned in the Primary Chronicle in 1019 when the Kievan Rus' took the stronghold from the Poles. It is one of the oldest cities in Belarus. It was hotly contested between the Polish rulers (kings, principal dukes and dukes of Masovia) and Kievan Rus princes, laid waste by the Mongols in 1241 (see: First Mongol invasion of Poland), and was not rebuilt until 1275. Later it was part of the territory of the Grand Duchy of Lithuania.

Grand Duchy of Lithuania
In 1390 Brest became the first city in the lands that now are Belarus to receive Magdeburg rights. In 1419 it became a seat of the starost in the newly created Trakai Voivodeship.

Lithuanian Crusade
Its suburbs were burned by the Teutonic Knights in 1379. In 1409 it was a meeting place of King Władysław II Jagiełło, Grand Duke Vytautas the Great and a Tatar khan under the Archbishop Mikołaj Trąba's initiative, to prepare for war with the Teutonic Knights. In 1410 the town mustered a cavalry banner that participated in the Polish-Lithuanian military victory at the Battle of Grunwald.

Polish—Lithuanian Commonwealth

In 1500, it was burned again by Crimean Tatars. In 1566, following the decree of Sigismund II Augustus, a new voivodeship was created – Brest Litovsk Voivodeship.

During the union of the Polish–Lithuanian Commonwealth and the Swedish Empire under king Sigismund III Vasa (Polish–Swedish union), diets were held there. In 1594 and 1596, it was the meeting-place of two remarkable councils of regional bishops of the Roman-Catholic Church and Eastern Orthodox Church. The 1596 council established the Uniate Church (also known as the Belarusian Greek Catholic Church in Belarus and Ukrainian Greek Catholic Church in Ukraine).

In 1657, and again in 1706, the town and castle were captured by the Swedish Army during its invasions of the Polish-Lithuanian Commonwealth. Then, in an attack from the other direction, on 13 January 1660, the invading Streltsy of the Tsardom of Russia under Ivan Andreyevich Khovansky took the Brest Castle in an early morning surprise attack, the town having been captured earlier, and massacred the 1,700 defenders and their families (according to an Austrian observer, Captain Rosestein).

Partitions
On 23 July 1792, the defending Grand Ducal Lithuanian Army, under the leadership of Szymon Zabiełło, and the invading Imperial Russian Army fought a battle near Grodno. On 19 September 1794, the area between Brest and Terespol was the site of another battle won by the Russian invaders led by Alexander Suvorov over a Polish-Lithuanian division under General Karol Sierakowski. Thereafter, Brest was annexed by Russia when the Poland-Lithuania Commonwealth was partitioned for the third time in 1795.

19th century
During Russian rule in the 19th century, Brest Fortress was built in and around the city. The Russians demolished the Polish Royal Castle and most Old Town "to make room" for the fortress. The main Jewish synagogue in the city, the Choral Synagogue, was completed c. 1862.

World War I

During World War I, the town was captured by the Imperial German Army under August von Mackensen on 25 August 1915, during the Great Retreat of 1915. Shortly after Brest fell into German hands, war poet August Stramm, who has been called "the first of the Expressionists" and one of "the most innovative poets of the First World War," was shot in the head during an attack on nearby Russian positions on 1 September 1915.

In March 1918, in the Brest Fortress on the western outskirts of Brest at the confluence of the Bug River and Mukhavets Rivers, the Treaty of Brest-Litovsk was signed, ending the war between Soviet Russia and the Central Powers and transferring the city and its surrounding region to the sphere of influence of the German Empire. This treaty was subsequently annulled by the Paris Peace Conference treaties which ended the war and even more so by events and developments in Central and Eastern Europe. During 1918, the city became a part of the Podolia Governorate of the Ukrainian People's Republic as a result of negotiations and own treaty between delegation of the Ukrainian Central Rada and Central Powers.

The Second Polish Republic
Following the Polish–Soviet War Brest became part of the Second Polish Republic, with borders formally recognized by the Treaty of Riga of 1921. It was renamed Brześć nad Bugiem on 20 March 1923 (Brest on the Bug) in Poland, and named the capital of the Polesie Voivodeship in accordance with the pre-1795 tradition. In the twenty years of Poland's sovereignty, of the total of 36 brand new schools established in the city, there were ten public, and five private Jewish schools inaugurated, with Yiddish and Hebrew as the language of instruction. The first-ever Jewish school in Brześć history opened in 1920, almost immediately after Poland's return to independence. In 1936 Jews constituted 41.3% of the Brześć population or 21,518 citizens. Some 80.3% of private enterprises were run by Jews. The Polish Army troops of the 9th Military District along with its headquarters were stationed in Brest Fortress.

During the German Invasion of Poland in 1939, the city was defended by a small garrison of four infantry battalions under General Konstanty Plisowski against General Heinz Guderian's XIX Panzer Corps. After four days of heavy fighting, the Polish forces withdrew southwards on 17 September. The Soviet invasion of Poland began on the same day. As a result, the Soviet Red Army entered the city at the end of September 1939 following the Molotov–Ribbentrop Pact's Secret Protocol, and a joint Nazi-Soviet military parade took place on 22 September 1939. While Belarusians consider it a reunification of the Belarusian nation under one constituency (the Byelorussian Soviet Socialist Republic at that time), Poles consider it the date when the city was lost. During the Soviet control (1939–41), the Polish population was subject to arrests, executions and mass deportations to Siberia and the Kazakh Soviet Socialist Republic.

The city had an overwhelmingly Jewish population in the Russian Partition: 30,000 out of 45,000 total population according to Russian 1897 census, which fell to 21,000 out of 50,000 according to the Polish census of 1931.<ref name=Browning>Christopher R. Browning, Nazi policy, Jewish workers, German killers', Google Print, p.124</ref>

Operation Barbarossa and beyond

 

On 22 June 1941, Brest Fortress and the city were attacked by Nazi Germany on the first day of Operation Barbarossa, Nazi Germany's invasion of the Soviet Union. The fortress held out for six days. Nearly all its Soviet army defenders perished. The Germans placed Brest under the administration of the Reichskommissariat Ukraine''. The remaining municipal Jewish population (about 20,000) was sequestered in the Brest ghetto established by the German authorities in December 1941 and later murdered in October 1942. Only seven Jews survived the Nazi executions. The city was liberated by the Red Army on 28 July 1944.

In early 2019, a mass grave containing the remains of 1,214 people were found in the Brest Ghetto area during a construction project. Most are believed to have been Jews murdered by Nazis.

Geography
Brest lies astride the Mukhavets River, which is known to Bresters as "the river". The river flows west through the city, dividing it into north and south, and meets the Bug River in the Brest Fortress. The river flows slowly and gently. You can hop into a tire innertube and take a relaxing float down this river. Today the river looks quite broad in Brest. The terrain is fairly flat around Brest. Brest was subject to flooding in the past. One of the worst floods in recorded history occurred in 1974.

Part of the floodplain was reclaimed with hydraulic mining. In the 1980s, big cutter-suction dredgers mined sand and clay from the riverbed to build up the banks.

In the 2000s, two new residential areas were developed in the southwest of Brest.

To the east of Brest, the Dnieper–Bug Canal was built in the mid-nineteenth century to join the river to Pina, a tributary of the Pripyat River which in turn drains into the Dnieper. Thus Brest has a shipping route all the way to the Black Sea. If not for a dam and neglected weirs west of Brest, north-western European shipping would be connected with the Black Sea also.

Climate
Brest has a humid continental climate but slightly leans towards oceanic due to the irregular winter temperatures that mostly hover around the freezing point. However, summers are warm and influenced by its inland position compared to areas nearer the Baltic Sea.

Points of interest

A majestic Soviet-era war memorial was constructed on the site of the 1941 battle to commemorate the known and unknown defenders of the Brest Fortress. This war memorial is the largest tourist attraction in the city. The Berestye Archeological Museum of the old city is located on the southern island of the Hero-Fortress. It has objects and huts dating from the 11th – 13th century that were unearthed during the 1970s.

The Museum of Rescued Art Treasures has a collection of paintings and icons. Brest City Park is over 100 years old and underwent renovations from 2004 to 2006 as part of a ceremony marking the park's centennial. In July 2009, the Millennium Monument of Brest was unveiled. Sovetskaya Street is a popular tourist destination in Brest; it was dramatically reconstructed in 2007–2009. Other important landmarks include the Brest Railway Museum.

Education
Brest is home to two Universities: A.S. Pushkin Brest State University and Brest State Technical University.

Transport
Being situated on the main railway line connecting Berlin and Moscow, and a transcontinental highway (the M1 highway is part of the European route E30 running from Cork to Omsk, where it links with Asian Highway 6 leading to Busan), Brest became a principal border crossing out of the Soviet Union in the postwar era. Today it links the European Union and the Commonwealth of Independent States.

The city of Brest is served by Brest-Tsentralny railway station. Because of the break-of-gauge at Brest, where the Russian broad gauge meets the European standard gauge, all passenger trains, coming from Poland, must have their bogies replaced here, to travel on across Belarus. The freight must be transloaded from cars of one gauge to cars of another. Some of the land in the Brest rail yards remains contaminated due to the transhipment of radioactive materials here since Soviet days. However, cleanup operations have been taking place.

The local airport, Brest Airport (code BQT), operates flights on a seasonal schedule to Kaliningrad in the Russian Federation and seasonal charter flights to Burgas and Antalya.

Sport

champions. Also, there is a Women's handball club in Brest – HC Victoria-Berestie.

HK Brest of the Belarusian Extraleague are the local pro hockey team.

The sports venues are located on the northern riverside on the hydraulic fill, consisting of an indoor track-and-field centre, the Brest Ice Rink, and Belarus' first outdoor baseball stadium. On the opposite riverside is a large rowing course opened in 2007, home of the National Center for Olympic Training in Rowing. It meets international requirements and can host international competitions.

Media
There are some newspapers in Brest: Brestskaya Gazeta, Brestskiy Kurier, Vecherniy Brest.

International relations

Sister cities
Sister cities of Brest include:

 Astrakhan, Russia
 Dorogomilovo District (Moscow), Russia
 Izhevsk, Russia
 Kaliningrad, Russia
 Kovrov, Russia
 Malgobek, Russia
 Nevsky District (Saint Petersburg), Russia
 Nizhny Tagil, Russia
 Novorossiysk, Russia
 Oryol, Russia
 Petrozavodsk, Russia
 Ryazan, Russia
 Tyumen, Russia
 Ivano-Frankivsk, Ukraine
 Lutsk, Ukraine
 Odesa, Ukraine
 Siedlce County, Poland
 Terespol, Poland
 Baienfurt, Germany
 Baindt, Germany
 Berg, Germany
 Ravensburg, Germany
 Weingarten, Germany
 Baiyin, China
 Xiaogan, China
 Batumi, Georgia
 Nakhchivan, Azerbaijan
 Coevorden, Netherlands
 Port-sur-Saône, France
 Subotica, Serbia

Former twin towns:
 Biała Podlaska, Poland

In March 2022, the Polish city of Biała Podlaska suspended its partnership with Brest as a reaction to the Belarusian involvement in the 2022 Russian invasion of Ukraine.

Other forms of cooperation
Brest maintains partnership with: 

 Ashdod, Israel
 Botoșani, Romania
 Brest, France
 Ludza, Latvia
 Maldon, England, United Kingdom
 Pleven, Bulgaria

Honours
A minor planet, 3232 Brest, discovered by the Soviet astronomer Lyudmila Ivanovna Chernykh in 1974, is named after the city.

Notable people
 

 Rabbi Yehoshua Leib Diskin, Rabbi of Brisk
 Menachem Begin, late Prime Minister of Israel
 Jarosław Dąbrowski, Polish revolutionary and general
 David Dubinsky, head of the International Ladies Garment Workers' Union
 Andrej Dyńko (b. 1974), journalist and editor
 Louis Gruenberg, composer
 Nikolay Karpol, Russian women's volleyball coach
 Jerzy Kolendo, Polish classical archaeologist and historian
 Harry Kopp (1880–1943), American lawyer and politician
 Pyotr Masherov, secretary of Belarusian committee of the Communist Party of Soviet Union
 Yulia Nesterenko, Olympian women's 100 m champion
 Dzmitryj Rubašeŭski (nom de guerre (“Hans”))(1992-2022), Belarusian volunteer killed in action defending Ukraine during the 2022 Russian invasion
 Nathan Sharon (1925–2011), Israeli biochemist, expert on lectins
 Hienadz Shutau (1975 – 2020), a protestor killed during the protests against the 2020 Belarusian presidential election
 The Soloveitchik rabbinical family associated with the Brisk yeshivas, and descendant Rabbi Joseph Soloveitchik
 David B. Steinman, American structural engineer; the designer of the Mackinac Bridge called "Big Mac"
 Aliaksandar Cvikievič (1888 – 1937), Belarusian politician, historian, jurist, philosopher and a victim of Stalin's purges 
 Ganna Walska, Polish opera singer
 Liubov Charkashyna, Belarusian bronze medallist in the individual all-around rhythmic gymnastics competition at the 2012 Summer Olympics
 Rabbi Aaron ben Meir of Brest, eighteenth-century rabbi
 Rabbi Aharon Leib Shteinman, haredi rabbi in Israel
 Sara Szweber, Bundist

Further reading
 Kristian Gantser [Christian Ganzer], Irina Yelenskaya, Yelena Pashkovich [et al.] (ed.): Brest. Leto 1941 g. Dokumenty, materiyaly, fotografii. Smolensk: Inbelkul’t, 2016.

See also
 Names of European cities in different languages: B

References

Notes

Sources

External links

 Brest Stories Guide – Audiotheatre on the history of anti-semitism and the Shoah in Brest from 1937 to 1944 by the independent Brest theatre "Krylja Cholopa" (English/Russian)
 

 
Archaeological sites in Belarus
Belarus–Poland border crossings
Cities in Belarus
Brest Litovsk Voivodeship
Brestsky Uyezd
Polesie Voivodeship
Populated places established in the 11th century
Populated places in Brest Region
1019 establishments in Europe
Holocaust locations in Belarus
Jewish communities destroyed in the Holocaust